WOTC is a radio station in Edinburg, Virginia.

WOTC may also refer to:

Wizards of the Coast, an American publisher of fantasy and science fiction games
Work Opportunity Tax Credit, an American federal tax credit for employers
XCOM 2: War of the Chosen, the expansion pack to the 2016 turn-based tactics videogame XCOM 2